Ellsworth Young (1866 – 1952) was an American magazine and book illustrator, and a noted painter of landscapes. He worked for the Works Progress Administration (WPA) Collection of the Illinois State Museum, and was employed by the Denver Times and the Chicago Tribune as an editorial illustrator. Ellsworth Young studied at The Art Institute of Chicago with Oliver Dennett Grover and John Vanderpoel.

Young, an Illinois artist, was a member of the Chicago Painters and Sculptors and the Oak Park River Forest Art League. He painted several posters for the war effort of World War I, his best-known probably being "Remember Belgium". The Allied Nations made use of images of supposed German atrocities to bolster their propaganda machine.

In 2010 Western Illinois University began looking at stored works of art to refurbish, and discovered a rolled-up painting which held "tremendous historical significance." It was a painting by Young of a river landscape in autumn, and had been commissioned in 1934 to hang in Monroe Hall (later known as Grote Hall) and remaining there for some 60 years until the Hall was demolished in 1991. The painting was sent to the Chicago Conservation Center to be restored.

Gallery

References

External links

 
 

1866 births
1952 deaths
American illustrators
19th-century American painters
American male painters
20th-century American painters
20th-century American male artists
People from Albia, Iowa
19th-century American male artists